James Loeb (August 6, 1867 – May 27, 1933) was an American banker, Hellenist and philanthropist.

Biography
James Loeb was the second born son of Solomon Loeb and Betty Loeb. He joined his father at Kuhn, Loeb & Co. in 1888 and was made partner in 1894, but he retired from the bank in 1901 due to severe illnesses.

In memory of his former lecturer and friend Charles Eliot Norton, in 1907 Loeb created The Charles Eliot Norton Memorial Lectureship. In 1911, he founded and endowed the Loeb Classical Library. He assembled a team of Anglo-American classicists to oversee the series, and arranged for publication through Heinemann (publisher) in London When James Loeb died, he bequeathed the Loeb Classical Library and funds to Harvard University to establish The Loeb Classical Library Foundation and to and to support research in the classics. 

He founded the Institute of Musical Art, which later became part of the Juilliard School of Music. That year he also turned over his collection of Arretine pottery to the Fogg Art Museum at Harvard.

He donated a large amount of funds to what is now called the Max Planck Institute of Psychiatry, which helped his former psychiatrist Emil Kraepelin to establish and maintain the Institute in its early days. Nevertheless, presumably unknown to Loeb, Kraepelin held racist views about Jews, and his student who took over the Institute, Ernst Rudin, was a leading advocate of racial hygiene and forced sterilization or killing of psychiatric inpatients for which he was personally honoured by Adolf Hitler.

A large portion of his significant art collection he left to the Museum Antiker Kleinkunst in Munich (today the Staatliche Antikensammlungen) ("Sammlung James Loeb"). He was a member of the English Society for the Promotion of Hellenic Studies.

Translations
 Paul Delcharme, Euripides and the Spirit of His Dreams
 Maurice Croiset, Aristophanes and the Political Parties at Athens
 Auguste Couat, Alexandrian Poetry under the First Three Ptolemies, 324-222 B.C.

References

Further reading
 James Loeb, 1887–1933: Kunstsammler und Mäzen, by Brigitte Salmen (ed.) for the Schloßmuseum des Marktes Murnau, Murnau, 2000. [This is a German-language exhibition-catalogue for a presentation of the life of James Loeb, collector and philanthropist at the Schloßmuseum Murnau, April 7 – July 9, 2000. The book contains essays from various authors (Brigitte Salmen, Dorothea McEwan, Erika Simon and others). It also contains a German translation of James Loeb's biographical essay Our Father: A Memorial [privately printed, 1929]; James Loeb: Unser Vater: Eine Denkschrift für Salomon Loeb, pp. 9–16.]
Olmstead, Andrea. “The Toll of Idealism: James Loeb—Musician, Classicist, Philanthropist.” The Journal of Musicology (St. Joseph, Mich.) 14.2 (1996): 233–262.

External links
 
Loeb Family Tree
James Loeb

1867 births
1933 deaths
American bankers
American people of German-Jewish descent
American philanthropists
German bankers
Jews and Judaism in Cincinnati
Jewish American philanthropists
Loeb family
American translators
Staatliche Antikensammlungen
Harvard College alumni